Marcelo Melo and André Sá were the defending champions, but Sa chose not to participate, and only Melo competed that year.
Melo partnered with Sebastián Prieto, but lost in the quarterfinals to Yves Allegro and Nicolas Mahut.

Jeff Coetzee and Wesley Moodie won in the final 6–2, 4–6, [10–8], against Jamie Murray and Kevin Ullyett.

Seeds

Draw

Draw

External links
 Draw

Portugal Open
Estoril Open
Estoril Open